Alphacaine or Alpha-caine is a brand name for a local anaesthetic preparation used for dental anesthesia. Depending on location and manufacturer it may contain either benzocaine, articaine, or lidocaine (with or without adrenaline).

References

Dental drugs